The Cobourg railway station in Cobourg, Ontario, Canada is served by Via Rail trains running between Toronto, Ottawa, and Montreal. The station is staffed, with ticket sales, free outdoor parking, and a wheelchair lift for access to the trains. There is no local transit service into the station, with the nearest bus stop being on Division Street.

On November 12, 2010, Via Rail unveiled a design for a new station building, which was built next to the existing station. The new building was estimated to cost $9 million CDN,  is wheelchair accessible, and contains a new island/boarding platform to accommodate expanded track lines with an overhead footbridge.

COVID-19 pandemic service reductions
Cobourg station departures were reduced due to the COVID-19 pandemic in Canada. The first train of the morning (Train 651), which many used to commute to work in Toronto, was eliminated from the schedule. While Via Rail announced a full restoration of service on its network as of the end of June 2022, Train 651 service currently remains under review.

See also

 List of designated heritage railway stations of Canada

References

External links

Via Rail stations in Ontario
Rail transport in Cobourg
Railway stations in Northumberland County, Ontario
Canadian National Railway stations in Ontario
Designated heritage railway stations in Ontario